The Bituminous Coal Queens of Pennsylvania is a 2005 documentary film directed by David Hunt and Jody Eldred about the fiftieth annual "Pennsylvania Bituminous Coal Queen" beauty pageant which took place on Sunday, August 17, 2003, at the State Theatre Center for the Arts (Uniontown, Pennsylvania). The film is produced by Hunt's wife Patricia Heaton, and prominently features actress Sarah Rush, who was herself a Coal Queen in her youth. Heaton describes the film as "an homage to small town America".

The film follows the past and present contestants and winners of the annual beauty pageant sponsored by the bituminous coal industry of Greene County, Pennsylvania and was shot over a 10-day period in August 2003.  The film's budget swelled from $45,000 to $350,000 after the licensing for the various song snippets that appear in the contestants' acts.

A memorable character is the pageant's stage manager, who is easily offended when the contestants make requests and suggestions. He has since been fired.

References

External links
 
 

American documentary films
Films about beauty pageants
Films shot in Pennsylvania
Films set in Pennsylvania
2005 films
2005 documentary films
Documentary films about coal in the United States
Documentary films about beauty pageants
Films set in 2003
2000s English-language films
2000s American films